The first series of All That Glitters: Britain's Next Jewellery Star started on 13 April 2021 and aired for six episodes concluding on 18 May 2021. The series was hosted by Katherine Ryan and the judges were Shaun Leane and Solange Azagury-Partridge.

Jewellers

Results and eliminations

Colour key

 Jeweller got through to the next round
 Jeweller was eliminated
 Jeweller was the series runner-up
 Jeweller was the series winner

Episodes
 Jeweller eliminated 
 Jeweller of the week 
 Winner

Episode 1

The Best Seller challenge was to create a set of three individual, but thematically similar, bangles. The Bespoke Brief was to make a pendant for a foster mother, to wear when she was being presented with an MBE.

Episode 2

The Best Seller challenge was to make a chain collar, featuring three different sized links of any shape or size. The Bespoke Brief was to make a sweetheart brooch for a househusband to give to his wife while she is away on military service.

Episode 3

The Best Seller challenge was to make a cocktail ring using alternate materials. The Bespoke Brief was to create a bib necklace for a drag artist to wear for their first solo performance.

Episode 4

The Best Seller challenge was to make hoop earrings, using 9-carat gold. The Bespoke Brief was to create a locket to give to a bone-marrow donor.

Episode 5

The Best Seller challenge was to make a cuff out of silver, and featuring at least five gemstones. The Bespoke Brief was to create an engagement ring, with gold and a 1 carat diamond.

Episode 6: Final

The Best Seller challenge was to make a pair of pearl drop earrings, using gold and either round or baroque pearls. The Bespoke Brief was to create a maang tikka, a traditional piece of Indian bridal jewellery.

References

2021 British television seasons
All That Glitters: Britain's Next Jewellery Star